The Maine Humanities Council  (MHC)
was founded in 1975 as a private nonprofit affiliate of the National Endowment for the Humanities. It is one of 56 humanities councils in the United States and its territories. The MHC is also home of the Harriet P. Henry Center for the Book, Maine's affiliate of the Center for the Book in the Library of Congress. 

The organizational mission states: "The Maine Humanities Council, a statewide non-profit organization, uses the humanities— literature, history, philosophy, and culture — as a tool for positive change in Maine communities. Our programs and grants encourage critical thinking and conversations across social, economic, and cultural boundaries."

Humanities organizations
Organizations based in Portland, Maine
1975 establishments in Maine
National Endowment for the Humanities